Brand  is a surname. It usually is a patronymic from the Germanic personal name Brando (="sword") or a short form of a compound personal name like Hildebrand. The surname originated separately in England, Scotland, Scandinavia, the Netherlands, and North Germany.  Also many Scandinavian Brands immigrated across Scandinavia and Europe. Notable people with the surname include:

Adam Brand (born 1970), Australian country music singer
Adolf Brand, (1874–1945), German activist for homosexual rights
Alexander Brand (born 1977), Colombian boxer
Andrea Brand (born 1959), American molecular biology professor at the University of Cambridge
Arie van den Brand (born 1951), Dutch GreenLeft politician
Aron Brand (1910–1977), Israeli pediatric cardiologist
Arthur Brand  (1853–1917), British Liberal politician
August Brand (1863–1930), German botanist
Charles Brand (1871–1966), U.S. Representative from Ohio
Charles Brand (1873–1961), Australian Army brigadier-general in World War I
Charles Amarin Brand (1920–2013), French prelate of the Roman Catholic Church
Charles Hillyer Brand (1861–1933), American politician, businessman, jurist and lawyer
Charles John Brand (1879–1949), United States Department of Agriculture official
Chris Brand (1943–2017), British psychologist
Christian Brand (born 1972), German football player and coach
Christianna Brand (1907–1988), British crime writer and children's author
Christine Brand (born  1973), Swiss writer and journalist
Christoffel Brand (1797–1875), South African statesman
Colette Brand (born 1967), Swiss freestyle skier
Daniel Brand (1935–2015), American wrestler
Daphny van den Brand (born 1978), Dutch cyclo-cross, road bicycle and mountain bike racer
David Brand, 5th Viscount Hampden (1903–1975), English peer, cricketer, soldier and banker
David Brand (1912–1979), Australian politician
David Brand (born 1951), English footballer and former National Coach of Samoa 2002 to 2005.
Dionne Brand, (born 1953), Canadian writer
Elton Brand, (born 1979), American basketball player and general manager
Erland Brand, (born 1922), Swedish painter
Esther Brand (1922–2015), South African athlete
Gerry Brand, (1906–1996), South African rugby union player
Gideon Brand van Zyl (1873–1956), South African Governor-General 
Glen Brand (1923–2008), American Freestyle wrestler
Gordon J. Brand (1955–2020), English golfer
Gordon Brand Jnr (1958–2019), Scottish golfer
Hans-Joachim Brand, (1916–1945), German Luftwaffe pilot
Hansi Brand, (1912–2000), Hungarian-born Zionist
Heather Brand (born 1982), Zimbabwean swimmer
Heiner Brand (born 1952), West German handball player and coach
Hennig Brand (c. 1630 – c. 1710), German alchemist and physician
Henry Brand, 1st Viscount Hampden (1814–1892), British politician
Henry Brand, 2nd Viscount Hampden (1841–1906), British Governor of New South Wales
Hubert Brand (1870–1955),  Royal Navy officer
Ilona Brand (born 1958), East German luger
Jack Brand (born 1953), German goalkeeper
Jack Brand (1976–2010), American experimental musician
Jan Brand (1908–1969), Dutch field hockey player
Jeroen Brand (born 1982), Dutch cricketer
Jo Brand (born 1957), British feminist comedian
Joel Brand (1907–1964), Holocaust survivor; co-founder of the Hungarian Aid and Rescue Committee
Johannes Brand (1823–1888), fourth president of the Orange Free State
Jolene Brand (born 1934), American actress
Joop Brand (born 1936), Dutch football player and manager
Katy Brand (born 1979), English actress, comedian and writer
Kris Brand (born 1983), Canadian volleyball player
Lotte Brand (1910–1986), German art historian
Lucinda Brand (born 1989), Dutch racing cyclist
Michael Brand (art historian) (born 1958), Australian scholar
Michael Brand (born 1973), German politician
Michael Brand (1815–1870), birth name of Hungarian composer Mihály Mosonyi
Millen Brand (1906–1980), American writer and poet
Mona Brand (1915–2007), Australian playwright, poet and freelance writer
Myles Brand (1942–2009). American University and NCAA president
Nadja Brand (born 1975), South African-born actress and producer
Neil Brand (born 1958), British dramatist, composer and author
Neville Brand (1920–1992) American actor
Oscar Brand (1920–2016), Canadian folk singer/songwriter
Paul Brand (disambiguation)
Peter Brand (disambiguation)
Pepe Brand (1900–1971), Spanish professional football player and manager
Quintin Brand (1893–1968), British pilot
Rachel Brand (born 1973), American lawyer, US Associate Attorney General 2017-18
Ralph Brand (born 1936), Scottish footballer
Renée Brand (1900–1980), Jewish-German writer in Exile in England
Robert Brand, 1st Baron Brand (1878–1963), British civil servant and businessman
Ron Brand (born 1940), American baseball player
Russell Brand (born 1975), English comedian and actor
Simón Brand (born 1970), Colombian film director
Steffen Brand, (born 1965), German steeple chase runner
Steven Brand, (born 1969), Scottish actor
Stewart Brand (born 1938), American writer, editor, and futurist
Theodor von Brand (1899–1978), German-born American parasitologist.
Theodor P. Von Brand (1926–2004), American judge, son of Theodor
Ulrich Brand (born 1967), German political scientist
Vance D. Brand (born 1931), American astronaut
William Brand (1888–1979), Australian politician
William H. Brand (1824–1891), New York politician
Fictional character
Brand, the Burning of Vengeance, a playable champion character in MOBA video game League of Legends

See also
Brands (surname)
Brandt (name)

References

External links 
 England’s Immigrants 1330 – 1550 Resident Aliens in the Late Middle Ages in England - the National Archives.
Germanic-language surnames